The Mazda Millenia is an automobile which was manufactured by Mazda in Japan from 1993 to 2002.

The Millenia was originally planned as the second of three models for Mazda's proposed luxury brand Amati. As the company's dwindling finances caused by the onslaught of the "bubble economy" prevented the launch of the Amati brand, the Millenia was released in the autumn of 1993 in Europe as the Mazda Xedos 9 and in Japan and Australia as the Eunos 800. The car was launched in North America in 1995 as the Mazda Millenia and in July 1997 the Japanese market Eunos 800 was also renamed to Mazda Millenia as Mazda discontinued the Eunos brand. There was no model link to the other Mazda marque, Ẽfini.

Having been developed for a separate market from typical Mazda customers, the Millenia boasted myriad finer details. It was engineered to far greater levels of perceived quality than existing Mazda cars, such as interior plastic quality, panel gap and thicker paint coating. The Millenia/Eunos 800/Xedos 9 was assembled along with the smaller Eunos 500/Mazda Xedos 6 in a new production line, presumably set up for Amati cars.

The Millenia does not have a direct predecessor or replacement in the Mazda product line, and production ceased with the introduction of the Mazda6 in 2002, itself a replacement for the 626. It appears to have received a brand-new platform, although the multi-link suspension at both ends strongly resembled that of the 1991 Mazda Sentia, with minor changes such as replacing the lower I-arm with an A-arm for front wheel drive. It was the only production car in the world to employ a Miller cycle engine (The current Demio/Mazda2 features Miller Cycle on one of its engines). Yaw-sensitive four-wheel steering was available as an option in Japan; Mazda claimed that with this feature, the Millenia was capable of passing the elk test at speeds comparable to the BMW 850i and Nissan 300ZX.

The 1997 Japanese market name change from Eunos 800 to Mazda Millenia was accompanied by a significant facelift that included some cost-saving measures. For instance, the hood was downgraded from aluminum to steel. The Millenia was again facelifted for the 2001 model year.

European designation
The Mazda Xedos 9 was a luxury car for Mazda of Europe. Sold between 1993 and 2002, the Xedos 9 was the export version of Mazda's upscale Eunos 800 on the Mazda T platform.

Engines:
 2.5 L KL-DE V6
 2.25 L KJ-ZEM V6 (Miller cycle)
 2.0 L V6, same as the unit found in the Xedos6

Japanese designation
The Eunos 800 was sold in Japan from 1993 through 1998. It was exported as the Xedos 9 and used the Mazda T platform. The Eunos 800 was also sold as a Eunos 800 in Australia, as both the 800M, with the Miller Cycle engine and the base 800, with the 2.5-litre engine. Both engines are slightly detuned compared to the Japanese spec engines, most likely because 95 octane fuel was the maximum octane rated fuel available in Australia at that time.

Engines:
 2.5 L KL-ZE V6
 2.25 L KJ-ZEM V6 (Miller cycle)

North American market
The car was launched in North America in 1994 (as a 1995 model year) as the Mazda Millenia, and would eventually replace the 929 as Mazda's flagship sedan offering in North America. The 929 had been the last non-luxury marque rear-wheel drive Japanese import sedan since the discontinuation of the Toyota Cressida in 1992, whereas the Millenia was front-wheel drive, and thus only capable of giving rivalry to the Nissan Maxima at the time. The Millenia was available in the U.S. with (The "Millenia S" spec) or without the Miller Cycle engine. Three models were offered; the base model, the mid-level Millenia with standard leather upholstery, power moonroof and remote keyless entry and the top-of-the-line S model which featured traction control, heated front seats, heavy duty wipers and the 2.3-liter V6 Miller-cycle engine.  The Miller cycle engine has a shorter compression stroke and a belt driven air compressor (essentially a supercharger)

Engines:
 2.5 L KL-DE V6
 2.3 L KJ-ZEM V6 (Miller cycle) (slightly modify version of the 2.25 L version sold in other markets but has same engine  code)

Eunos 800M SP
Mazda Motorsport Australia released a limited edition Eunos 800M SP with improved suspension and larger alloy wheel and tyre combination, but with no modifications to the engine.

Gallery

Amati
The first mention of the Amati luxury brand was in Motor Trend magazine February 1992 page 118, the article written by Maryann N. Keller. In the June 1992 issue, the Amati logo was displayed in green, and they mentioned that the advertising campaign was to be handled by Los Angeles based Lord, Dentsu & Partners who had an advertising campaign budget of $75 million, with a launch to be slated at the end of 1993. The November 1993 issue on page 18 stated that after Amati had been cancelled due to recession, the Millenia was originally to be sold as an Amati.

Production for the Millenia ended in 2002, without replacement.

Engines:
 2.5 L KL-DE V6
 2.3 L KJ-ZEM V6 (Miller cycle) -

Specifications and performance

References

Millenia
Front-wheel-drive vehicles
Executive cars
Mid-size cars
Sedans
Cars introduced in 1993
2000s cars